The 2016–17 Chicago State Cougars men's basketball team represented Chicago State University during the 2016–17 NCAA Division I men's basketball season. The Cougars, led by seventh-year head coach Tracy Dildy, played their home games at the Emil and Patricia Jones Convocation Center as members of the Western Athletic Conference. They finished the season 6–26, 1–13 in WAC play to finish in last place. Due to Grand Canyon's ineligibility for postseason play, they received the No. 7 seed in the WAC tournament where they lost in the quarterfinals to New Mexico State.

Previous season
The Cougars finished the 2015–16 season 4–28, 0–14 in WAC play to finish in last place. They lost in the quarterfinals of the WAC tournament to Cal State Bakersfield.

Offseason

Departures

Incoming Transfers

2016 recruiting class

Roster

Schedule and results

|-
!colspan=9 style=| Regular season

|-
!colspan=9 style=| WAC tournament

References

Chicago State Cougars men's basketball seasons
Chicago State